The sixth Central American Championships in Athletics were held at the Pista Eduardo Garnier in San José, Costa Rica, between November 19–21, 1971.

Medal summary
Some results and medal winners could be reconstructed from the archive of Costa Rican newspaper La Nación.

Men

Women

Medal table (incomplete)
Only medals from the 27 events with known results from above are counted.

Team Rankings
Costa Rica won the overall team ranking, Nicaragua won the team ranking in the men's category, and Panamá won the team ranking in the women's category.

Total

Male

Female

References

 
Central American Championships in Athletics
Central American Championships in Athletics
Sport in San José, Costa Rica
Central American Championships in Athletics
20th century in San José, Costa Rica
International athletics competitions hosted by Costa Rica